Frank W. McIntyre  (July 12, 1859 – July 8, 1887) was a Major League Baseball pitcher. He started one game for the 1883 Detroit Wolverines and two games for the 1883 Columbus Buckeyes.

External links
Baseball Reference.com page

1859 births
1887 deaths
Detroit Wolverines players
Columbus Buckeyes players
Major League Baseball pitchers
Baseball players from Michigan
Peoria Reds players
Terre Haute (minor league baseball) players
19th-century baseball players
People from Walled Lake, Michigan
19th-century deaths from tuberculosis
Tuberculosis deaths in Michigan